Ultra ATX is an  motherboard form factor proposed by Foxconn during CES in January 2008. In principle, it is simply an oversized version of ATX that supports 10 expansion slots, as opposed to the seven slots of ATX, and it requires a full-tower computer case to support the added height of the motherboard.

Purpose
Video cards often trend towards double-slot designs, due to the need for a large heatsink to effectively cool the graphics chipset. As a consequence, the expansion slot below the slot used by the graphics card is effectively blocked and cannot be used. This leaves an ATX quad-graphics system with effectively no expansion slots, as all of the additional slots are blocked by the video cards. The main purpose of Ultra ATX is to overcome this limitation and allow high-end systems to incorporate quad-graphics with additional room for expansion.

Further development

EVGA later introduced its 13.5-inch "X58 Classified 4-Way SLI", which requires an Ultra-ATX sized case to support four "double-slot" graphics cards. Available Ultra-ATX cases include the Thermaltake Xaser VI, LIAN LI PC-P80 and HEC Compucase 98 98R9BB.

References

Motherboard form factors
Foxconn
Computer-related introductions in 2008